Jack Louis Del Rio Jr. (born April 4, 1963) is an American football coach who is the defensive coordinator for the Washington Commanders of the National Football League (NFL). He played college football as a linebacker at the University of Southern California before being drafted by the New Orleans Saints in the third round of the 1985 NFL Draft. He also played for four other NFL teams before retiring in 1996.

Del Rio began his coaching career as an assistant with the Saints in 1997. He then joined the Baltimore Ravens as a linebacker coach in 1999, where he was a part of their Super Bowl XXXV winning team that beat the New York Giants. Following a single-season stint as Carolina Panthers defensive coordinator, Del Rio became head coach of the Jacksonville Jaguars in 2003. He compiled a 68–71 record and two playoff appearances with them before being fired after the 2011 season. 

Del Rio served as Denver Broncos defensive coordinator for the next three seasons before becoming head coach of the Oakland Raiders in 2015. He compiled a 25-23 record with the Raiders before being fired after the 2017 season. He spent the next two years working as an NFL analyst for ESPN before joining the Washington Commanders as their defensive coordinator in 2020.

Early years
Jack Louis Del Rio Jr. was born in Castro Valley, California, to big bandleader Jack Del Rio Sr., who was of Spanish descent, and an Italian-American mother. Famed singer Peggy Lee was briefly Del Rio's stepmother after having married Jack Sr.  Del Rio attended Hayward High School in Hayward, California, where he developed into a notable three-sport athlete, earning all-state honors in football, baseball, and basketball.

In football, Del Rio helped his team win a North Coast Section 2A Championship. In baseball, although he was the starting catcher, in one game Jack was used as a pitcher and struck out 16 in a playoff game against Mission San Jose-Fremont. Jack and future Seattle Mariners manager Don Wakamatsu were teammates in baseball and football.

College career
Del Rio was selected out of high school by the Toronto Blue Jays in the 22nd round (550th overall) of the 1981 MLB Draft, but opted instead to accept a scholarship from the University of Southern California to play both football and baseball. In baseball, Del Rio was as a two-year starter at catcher on a team that also included future Major League Baseball players Mark McGwire and Randy Johnson, as well as future baseball executive Damon Oppenheimer.

Del Rio was a four-year starter in football. As a junior, he made the third-team 1983 All-American team. As a senior, Del Rio earned consensus All-American honors, was a runner-up for the Lombardi Award given to the nation's best lineman or linebacker, and was named along with quarterback Tim Green co-MVP of the Rose Bowl. He finished his college career with 340 tackles, including 58 tackles for loss. Del Rio was named to the second-team All-Pac-10 in 1984, the first time in his college career he did not make first-team.

Professional career

New Orleans Saints
Del Rio was selected by the New Orleans Saints in the third round (68th overall) of the 1985 NFL Draft. He was also selected by the Los Angeles Express in the 1985 USFL Territorial Draft. As a rookie, Jack started nine games at right inside linebacker, tied a franchise record with five fumble recoveries (including one returned for a 22-yard touchdown) and earned NFL All-rookie honors. Del Rio also collected 68 tackles, five passes defensed and three forced fumbles. In 1986, Del Rio lost his starting position to Alvin Toles after the season opener and recorded only 20 tackles during the season.

Kansas City Chiefs
In August 1987, Del Rio was traded to the Kansas City Chiefs in exchange for a fifth round draft choice, reuniting him with former Saints defensive coordinator John Paul Young. He started nine  games at right outside linebacker, tallying 45 tackles, two sacks and a forced fumble.

That season the NFL players went on strike in September, after week two. Throughout this period of time, Del Rio and teammates picketed outside of Arrowhead Stadium and were vigilantly watching for replacement players attempting to enter the facility. He mistakenly mistook former Chiefs wide receiver Otis Taylor for a replacement player and assaulted him. At the time, the 45-year-old Taylor was a scout for the Chiefs organization and had been retired for twelve years. Taylor later pressed charges and the two eventually settled out of court.

Del Rio started ten games at left outside linebacker in 1988, registering 77 tackles, one sack, and one pass defensed. He was released on August 29, 1989.

Dallas Cowboys
On August 30, 1989, Del Rio was claimed off waivers by the Dallas Cowboys. He was named the starter at strongside linebacker in the fifth game against the Green Bay Packers, where he suffered a bruised calf that forced him to miss the next two games. Del Rio started twelve contests at strongside linebacker, while sharing the position with David Howard in the final eight games, playing in the first and third quarters, finishing the season with 58 tackles, two fumble recoveries (including one returned for a 57-yard touchdown) and one pass defensed.

The next year, Del Rio started all sixteen games at strongside linebacker, making 104 tackles (third on the team), 1.5 sacks, four quarterback pressures and two passes defensed. In 1991, Del Rio replaced Eugene Lockhart as the starter at middle linebacker, while leading the team with 130 total tackles, 53 assists and 77 solo tackles.

In the 1990s, the Cowboys organization felt they could avoid paying a premium and adversely impacting the salary cap by drafting linebackers, so they allowed players like Del Rio, Ken Norton Jr., Darrin Smith, Dixon Edwards, Robert Jones, and Randall Godfrey to leave via free agency.

Minnesota Vikings

On March 4, 1992, Del Rio signed with the Minnesota Vikings as a free agent. He led the team in tackles for three consecutive years and was selected to the 1995 Pro Bowl. In 1995, Del Rio suffered a knee injury in a game against the Chicago Bears and only played one more game that season, which would prove to be the last of his career.

Miami Dolphins
On June 2, 1996, Del Rio signed a one-year contract with the Miami Dolphins, reuniting him with former Cowboys head coach Jimmy Johnson. On August 4, he was released after being passed on the depth chart by rookie Zach Thomas. Del Rio finished his career with 160 game appearances (128 starts), 1,005 tackles, 13 sacks, and 13 interceptions.

NFL career statistics

Coaching career

Del Rio was hired by New Orleans Saints head coach Mike Ditka as the team's strength and conditioning coach in 1997, moving to linebacker coach the next year. In 1999, he took the same job with the Baltimore Ravens. Del Rio is, in part, credited for the success of the Ravens' Super Bowl-winning defense, particularly in the 2000 season. After the 2001 season, he was named defensive coordinator of the Carolina Panthers and in his first season, in 2002, Del Rio led them to the second ranked defense in the league by total yards.

Jacksonville Jaguars

In 2003, Del Rio became the second head coach of the Jacksonville Jaguars following Tom Coughlin's dismissal. In his first season, he led the team to a 5–11 record. That year, Jacksonville finished the season with the second-ranked rush defense and sixth best overall defense, having ranked 25th and 20th in those two categories, respectively, the year prior. In 2004, the Jaguars narrowly missed the playoffs with a 9–7 record, the first winning record in five seasons. The following season, the team made the playoffs for the first time since advancing all the way to the AFC title game in 1999. They qualified as a wild card; however, the season was ended with a 28–3 loss to the New England Patriots.

The mantra "keep chopping wood", introduced by Del Rio during the season, was intended to indicate how the team would slowly whittle away the huge obstacles in front of them. Del Rio placed a wooden stump and axe in the Jaguars' locker room as a symbol of his rallying cry. After his teammates had been taking swings at the wood with the axe, punter Chris Hanson followed suit and seriously wounded his non-kicking foot. Hanson missed the remainder of the 2003 season, being replaced by Mark Royals.

After missing the playoffs in 2006, Jacksonville cut quarterback Byron Leftwich in favor of David Garrard. The team returned to the playoffs in 2007 winning their first playoff game since 1999. On April 3, 2008, Del Rio's contract with the Jaguars was extended through the 2012 season.

On January 11, 2010, Del Rio was offered the head coaching job at USC, his alma mater. The next day he denied receiving an offer from USC, stating that the offer was "manufactured". Later that afternoon, he rebuffed USC officially, announcing that he would remain with the Jaguars at least through the duration of his current contract.

On November 29, 2011, Del Rio was fired as Jacksonville's head coach. He left with a regular season record of 68–71 and a 1–2 record in two playoff appearances over his nine years. From his years with the Jaguars, Del Rio holds the NFL record for the longest tenure of any head coach to have never won a division title.

Denver Broncos
On January 27, 2012, Del Rio was hired as the new defensive coordinator of the Denver Broncos. In Week 2, Del Rio was fined $25,000 for berating the replacement officials. On November 4, 2013, Del Rio was handed the head coaching duties and named interim head coach for several games when head coach John Fox was sidelined due to medical reasons.

Oakland Raiders
On January 14, 2015, Del Rio was hired to become the new head coach of the Oakland Raiders, replacing the fired Dennis Allen (who coincidentally had preceded him as the Broncos defensive coordinator) and interim head coach Tony Sparano.

In 2016, Del Rio led the Raiders to a 12–4 record, with the team making the playoffs for the first time since 2002. They lost to the Houston Texans in the wild card round.

On February 10, 2017, Del Rio signed a four-year contract extension. Del Rio was fired after the Raiders' 30–10 loss to the Los Angeles Chargers in the 2017 regular season finale, ending with a 6–10 record.

In 2019, he was under consideration to become the defensive coordinator of the Cincinnati Bengals, but talks ultimately ended after new head coach Zac Taylor decided he was not a fit.

Washington Football Team / Commanders
On January 2, 2020, Del Rio was hired by the Washington Football Team, then known as the Redskins, to serve as their defensive coordinator under head coach Ron Rivera. Del Rio changed their defensive scheme from a 3-4, which the team had used for the past decade, to a 4-3.

In June 2022, Del Rio made a controversial comment on his personal Twitter account where he referred the Capitol attack as a "dust up" and comparing the storming of the capitol to overturn official election results to the unrest that occurred during some of the 2020 George Floyd protests. In response to his comments the Washington Commanders fined Del Rio for $100,000 along with Head Coach Ron Rivera publicly stating Del Rio's views are not a reflection of the team.

Head coaching record

Awards and honors
 Selected to USC Athletic Hall of Fame (2014)
 NCAA Silver Anniversary award (2010)
 Super Bowl champion (XXXV) as coach
 All-Pro selection (1994)
 Pro Bowl selection (1994)
 NFL's All-Rookie Team (1985)
 Saints' Rookie of the Year (1985)
 CO-MVP of Rose Bowl (1985)
 All-America honors as a senior (1984)
 Pop Warner Trophy (1984)

Personal life

Del Rio earned an undergraduate degree in political science from the University of Kansas in 1990 while he was a player for the Kansas City Chiefs. In 2015, Del Rio was inducted into the USC Athletic Hall of Fame. In 2019, Del Rio worked as an analyst for ESPN. His son, Luke, was a college football quarterback for the Florida Gators in the mid 2010s and is an offensive quality control coach for the Washington Commanders.

Otis Taylor incident
During the 1987 NFL Player's strike, Otis Taylor was arriving at Arrowhead Stadium and was assaulted by Jack Del Rio, who was a new player to the organization in 1987 and was striking with his teammates. Del Rio mistook Taylor for a replacement player and was told Taylor was actually a Chiefs legend and retired player by fans who had come upon the assault. He later pressed charges against Del Rio and the two settled out of court.

Notes

References

External links
 
 Washington Commanders profile

1963 births
Living people
All-American college football players
American football linebackers
American people of Italian descent
American people of Spanish descent
Baltimore Ravens coaches
Carolina Panthers coaches
Coaches of American football from California
Dallas Cowboys players
Denver Broncos coaches
Denver Broncos head coaches
Jacksonville Jaguars head coaches
Kansas City Chiefs players
Minnesota Vikings players
National Conference Pro Bowl players
National Football League announcers
National Football League defensive coordinators
New Orleans Saints coaches
New Orleans Saints players
Oakland Raiders head coaches
Players of American football from California
Sportspeople from Hayward, California
University of Kansas alumni
USC Trojans baseball players
USC Trojans football players
Washington Commanders coaches
Washington Football Team coaches
Washington Redskins coaches
ESPN people